Cortivazol is a high-affinity agonist ligand for the glucocorticoid receptor and consequently is classified as a glucocorticoid.

It is sometimes abbreviated "CVZ".

References

External links

Corticosteroid esters
Glucocorticoids
Acetate esters